Andrew Cherng (pronounced ; born April 1948) is a Chinese-born American billionaire restaurateur. He is the founder and chairman of Panda Restaurant Group, based in Rosemead, California. He is the co-founder and chief executive officer (CEO) of Panda Express. The Cherngs invest out of their family office, the Cherng Family Trust.

Early life and education 
Cherng was born in April 1948 in Yangzhou, Jiangsu Province, Republic of China on the northern bank of the Yangtze River. His father was Ming-Tsai Cherng, a chef.

He and his family moved to Taiwan after the Kuomintang was defeated on mainland China in the end of the Chinese Civil War, and in 1963, his family moved to Yokohama, Japan, where his father had taken a job as a chef.

In 1966, at age 18, he immigrated to the United States to study at an American university. He earned a bachelor's degree in mathematics in 1970 from Baker University in Baldwin City, Kansas, and a master's degree in applied mathematics from the University of Missouri in 1972. At Baker he had met his future wife, Peggy Tsiang, born in Burma and raised in Hong Kong, who went on to earn a bachelor's degree in mathematics from Oregon State University in 1971 and a PhD in electrical engineering from the University of Missouri.

Business career 
In 1972, he moved to the Los Angeles area to help his cousin run a restaurant called Ting Ho. After a few months, he found a restaurant in Pasadena to take over.

In June 1973, along with his father Ming Tsai Cherng, they took over a restaurant and started a new Chinese restaurant called Panda Inn in Pasadena, California on Foothill Boulevard, using funds from the family and a Small Business Administration loan. It opened on June 8, 1973. The cuisine was more general Chinese than the Cantonese usually found in the area.
 
In 1983, Andrew Cherng opened the first Panda Express, a fast food restaurant, at the newly opened Glendale Galleria II mall in Glendale, California.  He had been prompted to start the spin off by the developer of the mall who had eaten at Panda Inn and invited Cherng to take a place at the food court.

The company had expanded to 100 restaurants by 1993, with the opening of an outlet at the University of California, Los Angeles.

Cherng has stated a preference for keeping the company closely held. However, in 2006 he told USA Today if the company could get a valuation close to that of Chipotle Mexican Grill, he might reconsider his stance. However, in an interview with The Seattle Times newspaper in 2008, he said he would not be interested in making the company public, saying they did not need the money and citing concerns with the trouble and expense of dealing with shareholders.

The Cherngs have since invested heavily in new restaurant concepts such as Just Salad, YakiYan, Ippudo, and Pieology.

In 2018, it was announced that the Cherng Family Trust purchased the former Mandarin Oriental hotel on the Las Vegas Strip and rebranded it as a Waldorf Astoria. The total acquisition price for the property was $214 million.

Philanthropy 
In February 2011, the Cherngs donated $2.5 million to support the Collins College of Hospitality Management at California State Polytechnic University, Pomona.

In March 2017, the California Institute of Technology announced that they were changing the name of its medical engineering department to the Andrew and Peggy Cherng Department of Medical Engineering after receiving a $30 million gift from Andrew and Peggy Cherng. In the following month, the University of Missouri announced receiving a $1.5 million gift from the Cherngs which would benefit its Honors College.

Personal life 
Andrew and Peggy, an engineer who was working for aircraft companies in the Los Angeles area, and who both first met in college, married in 1975. They have three daughters. Two of their daughters, Andrea and Nicole, work for the Panda company in its corporate headquarters in Rosemead. Their daughter Michelle is a primary/secondary school teacher.

In 2015, it was reported that he and his wife had invested $15.2 million in a beachfront property and home in Honolulu. In 2018, the couple purchased a mansion in Henderson, Nevada.

Honors 
 Since 2010, Cherng has been a member of the Committee of 100, an international, non-profit, non-partisan membership organization that brings a Chinese American perspective to issues concerning Asian Americans and U.S.-China relations.
 In 2008, Cherng was listed in Forbes' Twenty-Five Notable Chinese-Americans.
 In 2008, California State Polytechnic University, Pomona conferred Cherng with an honorary doctorate.

References

External links
Committee of 100 Member Roster

20th-century American businesspeople
21st-century American businesspeople
American billionaires
American chief executives of food industry companies
American food company founders
Baker University alumni
Businesspeople from Jiangsu
Businesspeople from Los Angeles
Chinese emigrants to the United States
Fast-food chain founders
People from Pasadena, California
Members of Committee of 100
University of Missouri alumni
1948 births
Living people
Chinese Civil War refugees
American people of Taiwanese descent